
Gmina Dębno is an urban-rural gmina (administrative district) in Myślibórz County, West Pomeranian Voivodeship, in north-western Poland.

The Barnówko-Mostno-Buszewo oil field is located in the gmina.

Villages
Apart from the town of Dębno, Gmina Dębno contains the villages and settlements of Barnówko, Bogusław, Borne, Borówno, Choszczówko, Cychry, Dargomyśl, Dolsk, Dyszno, Grzybno, Grzymiradz, Hajnówka, Juncewo, Klępin, Krężelin, Krześnica, Łazy, Młyniska, Mostno, Oborzany, Ostrowiec, Piołunek, Przylaszczka, Radzicz, Różańsko, Sarbinowo, Smolnica, Suchlica, Sulisław, Turze, Warnice and Więcław.

Neighbouring gminas
Gmina Dębno is bordered by the town of Kostrzyn nad Odrą and the gminas of Boleszkowice, Lubiszyn, Mieszkowice, Myślibórz and Trzcińsko-Zdrój.

References
Polish official population figures 2006

Debno
Myślibórz County